The  is a railway line in Japan operated by Hokkaido Railway Company (JR Hokkaido), which connects  in Sapporo and  in Tōbetu, Ishikari District.

On 19 November 2016, JR Hokkaido's president announced plans to further rationalise the network by up to 1,237 km, or ~50% of the current network,. The non-electrified section of the Line was permanently closed on 17 April 2020.

Stations
All trains, include through trains from other lines, are local trains. Sometimes, trains may skip ROYCE' Town station (marked "◌").

Closed section

Rolling stock
As of April 2020, the following electric multiple unit (EMU) rolling stock is used on the Sasshō Line.

 721 series EMUs (since 1 June 2012)
 731 series EMUs (since 1 June 2012)
 733 series EMUs (since 1 June 2012)
 735 series EMUs (since 1 June 2012)

Former rolling stock
Prior to the 27 October 2012 timetable revision, and closures on 17 April 2020, the following diesel multiple unit (DMU)  and EMU rolling stock was used on the Sasshō Line.

 KiHa 40 series DMUs
 KiHa 141 series DMUs
 KiHa 201 series DMUs
 711 series EMUs

History
The first part of the line to open was the northern (and now closed) section between Ishikari-Numata (on the Rumoi Main Line) to Nakatoppu (present-day ). This line was extended southward from Nakatoppu to Urausu on 10 October 1934, and the Soen to Ishikari-Tobetsu section, initially named , opened on 20 November 1934. The section between Urausu and Ishikari-Tobetsu opened on 3 October 1935, linking the north and south lines, which were unified as the "Sasshō Line".

Nakatoppu Station was renamed Shin-Totsukawa in 1953.

The section between Shin-Totsukawa and Ishikari-Numata was closed on 1 April 1972.

With the privatization of JNR on 1 April 1987, ownership of line was transferred to JR Hokkaido.

Duplication
The section between Hachiken and Ainosato-Kyoikudai was double-tracked between 1995 and 2000.

Electrification
The line was electrified over the 28.9 km section from Sōen Station to Hokkaidō-Iryōdaigaku Station in 2012, with engineering work completed by March 2012. New 733 series EMUs were introduced from June 2012, with all trains operated using EMUs from the start of the revised timetable on 27 October 2012.

Part Closure in 2020
JR Hokkaido had been planning to permanently close the section between Hokkaido-Iryodaigaku and Shin-Totsukawa on 7 May 2020, but the company moved closure forward to 17 April due to the COVID-19 outbreak.

Former connecting lines

 Shinkotoni Station: An 11 km horse-drawn  gauge line operated from Sapporo north west to Kawabata, opening in 1911 and crossing the Sassho Line near Shinkotoni. Petrol locomotives were introduced in 1922. The line was replaced by buses in 1943.
 Tobetsu Station: A 31 km 762 mm gauge line was opened to Obukuro in sections between 1949 and 1952. Typhoon Marie (1954) caused significant damage to the line, and repair was considered impractical. The line was formally closed in 1958. An 11 km 762 mm gauge line operated to Ebetsu, on the Hakodate Main Line, although at each terminus, the 762 mm gauge stations were on the opposite banks of the Tobetsugawa and Ishikarigawa rivers (respectively) to the JR stations.

References

External links

Lines of Hokkaido Railway Company
Rail transport in Hokkaido
1067 mm gauge railways in Japan
Railway lines opened in 1931